Algerian–Kosovar relations are foreign relations between Algeria and Kosovo.

History 
In March 2008, Mourad Medelci, Algerian Foreign Minister, stated that while Algeria sympathised with all Muslim countries, it believed that international laws had to be adhered to. A year later, Medelci reaffirmed the Algerian position of Kosovo being an integral part of Serbia. In May 2009, the Ambassador of Algeria to Serbia, Abdelkader Mesdoua stated that Algeria would reconsider the issue of Kosovo if Serbia changed its own position.

Notes

See also 
 Foreign relations of Algeria
 Foreign relations of Kosovo
 Algeria–Serbia relations

References 

Kosovo
Algeria